Purwakarta Station (PWK) is a class I railway station located in Nagritengah, Purwakarta, Purwakarta Regency. The station, which is located at an altitude of +84 meters, is included in the Bandung Operational Area II. This station is located very close to the Purwakarta regent's office which can be reached on foot.

History

The Cikampek–Purwakarta railway segment was inaugurated on 27 December 1902, and arrived at Padalarang on 2 May 1906. Built by Staatsspoorwegen (SS), these lines were built to reduce the travel time for the Jakarta-Bandung train journey. SS relies heavily on this line for express trains. When compared to via Cianjur, SS built this route for service users who wanted to get to Bandung quickly.

The trains that run on the cross are named the Vlugge Vier ("Fast 4"), describing the reliability, ruggedness and speed of this train challenging the steep terrain on the track. This station is one of the changing points for the steam locomotive because of the transition from the steep, winding terrain to the flat terrain. Another locomotive change point is also at  Station.

In the past, there were branches leading to the Pertamina Depot and the Jatiluhur Dam, which were only used during construction. The branch is devoted to carrying the water turbine which is disembarked from the ship via  Station. Now, leaving only a small part, including bridges and level crossings. Now the line is abandoned.

Building and layout
This station has six railway lines with line 1 being a straight double line from the direction of Jakarta and line 2 being a straight double line to Jakarta as well as a single line from and to Bandung. The partial double track was initiated in early 2002 and completed in 2004.

Until the mid-1980s, when the steam locomotive faded, Purwakarta Station was the place to change locomotives for trains from Jakarta to Bandung. The flat-cross locomotive which pulled the train from Jakarta was replaced with a mallet locomotive which is more suitable for mountainous areas. Therefore, Purwakarta Station is supported by a large enough locomotive depot even though the main station building is relatively small. The locomotive depot would not operate possibly after the mass abandonment of the steam locomotive. However, due to the plan to re-operate the depot, the depot building has been renovated.

This station is the "final resting place" for all non-AC economy electric trains that have operated across Jabodetabek since the abolition of non-AC EMUs on 25 July 2013. Here there are Rheostatic EMU, BN-Holec, and Hitachi. Not to forget, the rest of the carriages electric trains Tōyō Rapid 1000, Tokyo Metro 5000, diesel-hydraulic locomotives, and a series of conservation trains belonging to PT KAI were also sent here. A number of these abandoned EMUs were sold, bulldozed, or destroyed and later deleted from the list of facilities owned by PT KAI and PT KCI.

Other KRL service stations are at  Station, namely PT KAI's executive AC KRL which was imported or produced before 2009 and KRL owned by PT KAI and PT KCI which is not extended.

Services
The following is a list of train services at the Purwakarta Station.

Passenger services

Mixed class
Economy class
Local economy
Local Cibatu/Simandra, from and to 
Walahar Ekspres/Local Purwakarta, from and to 

References

External links
 

Purwakarta Regency
Railway stations in West Java
Railway stations opened in 1902